Talis gigantalis is a moth in the family Crambidae described by Ivan Nikolayevich Filipjev and A. Diakonoff in 1924. It is found in Kazakhstan.

References

Ancylolomiini
Moths described in 1924
Moths of Asia